Gail Helen McIntosh (1955 – 4 January 2018) was a New Zealand politician of the National Party.

Biography

McIntosh was an accountant. She lived in Tauranga, with her own accounting practice Gail McIntosh Accountants Ltd.

She represented the electorate of Lyttelton in Parliament from 1990 to 1993. She was one of six one-term National MPs who were elected in a swing against Labour in the 1990 election. She was a challenger to Winston Peters for the National nomination in Tauranga.

In 1993, McIntosh was awarded the New Zealand Suffrage Centennial Medal.

In the 1996 election, McIntosh stood for the United New Zealand party in the  electorate.

She died on 4 January 2018 after a short illness.

References

 1990 Parliamentary Candidates for the New Zealand National Party by John Stringer (New Zealand National Party, 1990)

1955 births
2018 deaths
Date of birth missing
New Zealand National Party MPs
New Zealand accountants
Tauranga City Councillors
Women members of the New Zealand House of Representatives
New Zealand MPs for Christchurch electorates
People from Woodville, New Zealand
United New Zealand politicians
Unsuccessful candidates in the 1996 New Zealand general election
Members of the New Zealand House of Representatives
Recipients of the New Zealand Suffrage Centennial Medal 1993